Naftali Herstik (born 1947) is a well known chazzan (cantor) and teacher. He was born in Salgótarján, Hungary and came with his family to Israel at the age of three. He is descended from a long line of cantors and Rabbis, and was recognized as a cantorial prodigy from his early childhood, singing as a teen in concerts with Cantor Moshe Koussevitzky.

Education 
Herstik's first teacher was his father, Moshe Menachem Herstik. Subsequently, he studied with Cantors Leib Glantz and Shlomo Ravitz. He later graduated from the Royal College of Music in London.

Professional accomplishments 
Cantor Herstik served as the Cantor of the Finchley Synagogue in London while simultaneously studying at the Royal College of Music. In 1981, he was appointed the Chief Cantor of the Jerusalem Great Synagogue, a position he held up to December 31, 2008. He has performed with the London Festival Orchestra, the London Mozart Players, the Jerusalem Symphony Orchestra, The Israel Philharmonic as well as many choirs, including the one at the Jerusalem Great Synagogue. In February, 2010, Cantor Herstik led a Shabbat service at the Yeshurun Synagogue, Edgware, London.

Style 
Cantor Herstik's style of Cantorial music bears a Western European influence, often employing the compositions of Louis Lewandowski, Moshe Kraus, Salomon Sulzer and Samuel Alman, and he has participated in concerts in Europe and Israel dedicated to their compositions. Herstik is also known for his interpretations of the works of Cantor Yossele Rosenblatt. In addition, he has written a number of compositions.

Tel Aviv Cantorial Institute 
In 1984, he was approached, together with Cantor Moshe Stern, Elli Jaffe and Dr. Tzvi Talmon, to start a school that teaches and preserves the tradition of the Cantorial arts. The school operated out of Heichal Shlomo for three years, before moving to Tel Aviv in 1987. In 1991, the school came under the auspices of the municipality of Tel Aviv, and Cantor Herstik was appointed the Artistic director, and subsequently the general director. Many of today's prominent cantors studied at the TACI, including Yitzchak Meir Helfgot, Moshe Haschel, Azi Schwartz, and Gideon Zelermyer. Cantor Herstik's own sons are affiliated with the school; his son, Cantor Shraga Herstik, is on the faculty, and his son Cantor Netanel Hershtik, the Cantor of the Hampton Synagogue, is a graduate. Cantor Hershtik has often appeared with a choir comprising students of the institute.

Discography 
 Prayers from Jerusalem
 Jerusalem Great Synagogue Choir
 Sound of Prayer (1997)
 Jerusalem of Prayer (1997)
 The Best of Naftali Herstik (1994)
 The Danzig Tradition
 The Koenigsberg Tradition
 One Family (2003)
 Shirei Yosef-Songs of Yossele (2003)

References

External links 
 Cantor Naftali Herstik at the Milken Archive
 Tel Aviv Cantorial Institute

Living people
Alumni of the Royal College of Music
Israeli hazzans
Israeli expatriates in England
20th-century Israeli male singers
Israeli people of Hungarian-Jewish descent
21st-century Israeli male singers
People from Salgótarján
1947 births